1958 in philosophy

Events

Publications 
 Peter Winch, The Idea of a Social Science and Its Relation to Philosophy (1958)
 Gaston Bachelard, The Poetics of Space (1958)
 Michael Polanyi, Personal Knowledge: Towards a Post-Critical Philosophy (1958)
 Clifton Fadiman (editor), Fantasia Mathematica (1958)
 Hannah Arendt, The Human Condition (1958)
 Isaiah Berlin, Two Concepts of Liberty (1958)
 Raymond Williams, Culture and Society (1958)

Philosophical literature 
 Willem Frederik Hermans, The Darkroom of Damocles (1958)

Births 
 March 12 - Thomas Metzinger

Deaths 
 May 2 - Alfred Weber (born 1868)
 October 24 - G. E. Moore (born 1873)
 November 8 - Ralph Waldo Trine (born 1866)
 December 15 - Wolfgang Pauli (born 1900)

References 

Philosophy
20th-century philosophy
Philosophy by year